Miss St. Kitts and Nevis is a national beauty pageant in Saint Kitts and Nevis.

History
In 1957, the first Miss St. Kitts and Nevis had chosen in under Basil Henderson directorship, Judy Mestier. Over the years since the start of St. Kitts National Carnival, thousands of people have converged on “Carnival City” to see, what many people consider to be, the premiere event of carnival, the National Queen Show. No other show, except the calypso final, has come dose In consistently attracting packed audience, not to forget the thousands more who “glue’ themselves to radios arid listen to the captivating descriptions of testants on stage This show strikes home, more than any other, to the heart of carnival in its annual selection of ambassador for St. Kitts and Nevis.

Titleholders
From 1977 to 1981 Miss St. Kitts & Nevis winners competed at Miss Universe and from 1985 to 2015 participated at Miss World competition.

{| class="wikitable sortable" style="font-size: 95%; text-align:center"
!Year||Miss Saint Kitts and Nevis
|- 
|1957
|Judy Mestier
|-
|1958
|Claudina Bagnal 
|-
|1971
|Hazel Brookes 
|-
|1972
|Louvina Bertie 
|-
|1973
|Marguerite Arthurton 
|-
|1974
|Jennifer Evelyn 
|-
|1975
|Shirley Webbe
|-
|1976
|Annette Frank 
|-
|1977
|Aurelie Buchanan 
|-
|1978
|Cheryl Chadderton 
|-
|1979
|Cheryl Dore 
|-
|1980
|Marva Warner 
|-
|1981
|Ichel Jeffers 
|-
|1982
|Caroline Buchanan 
|-
|1983
|Ithlane Archibald 
|-
|1984
|Karen Grant 
|-
|1985
|Jacqueline Heyliger 
|-
|1986
|Jennifer Hensly 
|-
|1987
|Haley Cassius 
|-
|1988
|Rosie Hodge 
|-
|1989
|Carla Johnson 
|-
|1990
|Wendy Peets 
|-
|1991
|Janetta Maloney 
|-
|1992
|Uazel Glasford 
|-
|1994
|Tracy Thompson 
|-
|1995
|Youlouca Armony 
|-
|1996
|Gloria Esdaille 
|-
|1997
|Tamika Pereira 
|-
|1998
|Nicola St. Catherine 
|-
|1999
|Giselle Lewis 
|-
|2000
|Nicole Gumbs 
|-
|2001
|Wanda Connor 
|-
|2002
|Genieve Hanley 
|-
|2003
|Dibye Bass (resigned) then Correlle Ferlance
|-
|2004
|Johan Kelly 
|-
|2005
|Genelle Howell 
|-
|2006
|Tesia Burton 
|-
|2007
|Mariece Roberts 
|-
|2008
|Samantha Boone 
|- 
|2009
|Sudeakka Francis 
|-
|2010
|Iantavian Queeley 
|-
|2011
|Kalia Huggins
|-
|2012
|Zinga Imo
|-
|2013
|Kaeve Armstrong 
|-
|2014
|Tishima Browne
|-
|2015
|Orngel Erskine
|-
|2016
|Katherina Davis 
|-
|2017
|Sheniqua Lanns 
|-
|2018
|Tawanna Collins
|-
|2019
|Hardai Baley
|-
|2020
|n/a
|-
|2021
|Nekirah Nicholls
|-
|2022
|Shafeyah Guishard

References

External links
 www.skncarnival.com

St. kitts and Nevis
St. Kitts and Nevis
Recurring events established in 1958
Beauty pageants in Saint Kitts and Nevis
Saint Kitts and Nevis awards
1958 establishments in Saint Kitts and Nevis